Earl Merkel (born 1955) is an American novelist, journalist and freelance writer, and radio talk show host for Money & More (2003–12). In 2013, he began producing and hosting his talk-radio program "The Book, With Earl Merkel."  His works have appeared in a variety of general-circulation, speciality and corporate publications.

Merkel also writes for a number of publications. He authored the "Chicken Little" article, a satire that was rumored to have gotten him banned from the op-pages of a major newspaper publisher.

Merkel obtained his B.A. in journalism from the University of Illinois. While a student at the university, he wrote articles for The Daily Illini, the student-run newspaper. He was there when nationwide protests erupted at Kent State and other universities, during the Vietnam War. His story about unrest on the campus of the University of Illinois, "300 of Guard Used in Campus Disturbances," was published on March 4, 1970, on page one of the Illini, when three hundred National Guard members appeared on campus, with gas masks, tear gas and bayonets attached to their unloaded rifles, to enforce curfews on the grounds of the university.

Merkel worked for more than ten years as a journalist, columnist, and commentator but is now a full-time novelist. He resides in Chicago, Illinois.

Selected works
He is the author of fictional novels, as listed below.

Fallout, Diversion Books, 2015. 
The Law Of Unintended Consequences, Elmtree Press, 2015.
Fire Of The Prophet, Diversion Books, 2013. 
Virgins and Martyrs, Five Star, 2008.
Dirty Fire, Signet, 2003.
Final Epidemic, Signet, 2002.

References

External links

Interview with Merkel, with picture

1955 births
Living people
American male novelists
American male journalists
21st-century American novelists
University of Illinois alumni
20th-century American novelists
20th-century American journalists
20th-century American male writers
21st-century American male writers
21st-century American non-fiction writers